The 2001 World Short Track Speed Skating Championships took place between March 29 and 31, 2001 in Jeonju, South Korea. The World Championships are organised by the ISU which also run world cups and championships in speed skating and figure skating.

Results

Men

† In the final of the Men's 1500 m, Min Ryoung and Terao Satoru crossed the finish line at the same time, thus both were awarded silver medals.

* First place is awarded 34 points, second is awarded 21 points, third is awarded 13 points, fourth is awarded 8 points, fifth is awarded 5 points, sixth is awarded 3 points, seventh is awarded 2 points, and eighth is awarded 1 point in the finals of each individual race to determine the overall world champion. The relays do not count for the overall classification.

Women

* First place is awarded 34 points, second is awarded 21 points, third is awarded 13 points, fourth is awarded 8 points, fifth is awarded 5 points, sixth is awarded 3 points, seventh is awarded 2 points, and eighth is awarded 1 point in the finals of each individual race to determine the overall world champion. The relays do not count for the overall classification.

Medal table

External links
ISU Results

World Short Track Speed Skating Championships
World Short Track Speed Skating Championships
2001 in short track speed skating
Sports competitions in Jeonju
International speed skating competitions hosted by South Korea